Huang Wen-Po (born October 29, 1971) is a Taiwanese baseball player who competed in the 1992 Summer Olympics.

He was part of the Chinese Taipei baseball team which won the silver medal. He is a right-handed pitcher.

External links
profile

1971 births
Living people
Baseball players at the 1992 Summer Olympics
Olympic baseball players of Taiwan
Baseball players from Tainan
Olympic silver medalists for Taiwan
Fu Jen Catholic University alumni
Olympic medalists in baseball
Medalists at the 1992 Summer Olympics